Pennsylvania Route 14 (PA 14) is a Pennsylvania highway that runs for . It runs from U.S. Route 15 (US 15) in Trout Run, Pennsylvania to the New York-Pennsylvania border at Fassett, Pennsylvania, co-signed with US 6 for a short distance in Troy. The highway continues in New York as New York State Route 14 (NY 14).

It once extended south all the way to the Maryland border, following Lycoming Creek Road, High Street, Hepburn Street, Market Street and East Third Street through the Williamsport area. It roughly followed the Susquehanna Trail to Northumberland, US 11 to Shamokin Dam, US 15 to York Springs, and PA 94 to Maryland.

Route description 

PA 14 begins at US 15 in Trout Run in Lycoming County and heads northeast, paralleling Lycoming Creek. It then turns more northerly at Bodines before crossing into Tioga County. It runs through Roaring Branch before entering Bradford County.

In Bradford County, PA 14 provides access to Grover, then forms a short concurrency with PA 414, splitting up in Canton. North of Canton, PA 14 passes through Alba before serving as the west terminus of PA 514 south of Troy. At Troy, PA 14 joins with US 6. PA 14 then splits off to the north to Columbia Cross Roads. PA 14 then runs through Snedekerville, Gillett, and Fassett before crossing the New York state line and becoming NY 14.

History
PA 14 was formed in 1927, stretching from the Maryland state line to the New York state line. When formed, it was concurrent with several U.S. Highways in the Williamsport area, including US 111, US 120, and US 220. From Harrisburg to York, it followed US 15 and what is today PA 94 via the Susquehanna Trail. In 1930, the route was realigned onto what is now PA 405 from Lewisburg to Muncy.

By 1940, US 111 was redesignated as US 15. As in previous years, PA 14 remained concurrent with the roadway now carrying US 15 to Northumberland. From Northumberland south to Duncannon, PA 14 was realigned onto the western bank of the Susquehanna River, creating an overlap with US 11. At Duncannon, US 11 split from PA 14 and crossed the Susquehanna while PA 14 continued south along the riverbank to Lemoyne, a suburb of Harrisburg. Here, PA 14 joined US 11 on a brief overlap east across the Susquehanna into Harrisburg. At Front Street, US 11 turned north while PA 14 continued east on Market Street. PA 14 then turned right onto 4th Street, following the road out of Harrisburg to Paxtang, where PA 14 terminated at US 322 and US 422. In 1941, PA 14 was rerouted to the east side of the Susquehanna River from Muncy to Clarks Ferry on what is now Interstate 180 and PA 147; the US 15 designation was moved west to run concurrent with US 11. From Clarks Ferry to Harrisburg, PA 14 was concurrent with US 22 and US 322. By 1960, PA 14 was truncated to end at US 22 and US 322 in Clarks Ferry.

In 1963, the Susquehanna Riverbank extension of PA 14 became PA 147. PA 14 was truncated to terminate at US 15 in Trout Run.

Major intersections

See also

References

External links

Pennsylvania Highways: PA 14
Pennsylvania Roads - PA 14

014
Transportation in Lycoming County, Pennsylvania
Transportation in Bradford County, Pennsylvania